The Lake Washington School District #414 or LWSD is a public school district in King County, Washington, in suburbs east of Seattle. Its headquarters is in Redmond.  it is the second-largest school district in Washington. It serves the region to the east of Lake Washington, one of the wealthiest in the Puget Sound area.

In October 2021, the district had a student enrollment of 30,500.

Boundary
The district serves the vast majority of Redmond, almost all of Kirkland, the majority of Union Hill-Novelty Hill, north Sammamish, and parts of Bellevue, Cottage Lake, and Woodinville. The portion of Kenmore in the district is in the Saint Edward State Park.

History
The district was formed in 1944 by combining three smaller districts: 
 Redmond School District #208
 Kirkland School District #224
 Juanita School District #21

The new district had seven schools; as of 2022, it has 56.

In August 2012, LWSD moved the freshman class into its four high schools, and converted the junior highs to middle schools (grades 6–8).

High schools

Traditional high schools 
Formerly operated as senior high schools (grades 10–12), the four high schools added the freshman class in August 2012. All compete in the Kingco conference; all but Eastlake are Class 3A, while Eastlake is Class 4A.
{| class="wikitable sortable"
!High school
!Location
!Opened
!Mascot
!Colors
!Approx.students
!WIAAclass
|-
|Eastlake 
|Sammamish
|align=center|1993
|Wolves
|Crimson/black
|align=center|1,865
|align=center|4A
|-
|Juanita 
|Kirkland
|align=center|1971
|Ravens
|Red/white/blue
|align=center|1,384
|align=center|3A
|-
|Lake Washington 
|Kirkland
|align=center|1923
|Kangaroos
|Purple/white
|align=center|1,555
|align=center|3A
|-
|Redmond
|Redmond
|align=center|1965
|Mustangs
|Green/gold
|align=center|1,870
|align=center|4A
|}

Choice High Schools 
{| class="wikitable"
!School 
!Location 
!Opened
!Mascot
!Colors
!Approx.Students
|-
|Emerson High School
|Kirkland 
|
||Dragon
|align=left| Rainbow
|align=center|50
|-
|Futures School
|Kirkland 
|
|
|
|align=center|33
|-
|International Community School
|Kirkland
|
|Phoenix
|Red/gold/black
|align=center|184
|-
|Tesla STEM High School
|Redmond
|
|
|Green/blue/white
|align=center|603
|-
|Cambridge Program*
|Kirkland
|
|
|
|
|}
*The Cambridge Program is part of Juanita High School. The students in this program are students of Juanita High School, but are part of a different program.
 As of August 2020

Other high schools
Lake Washington Technical Academy

Middle schools
The junior highs (grades 7–9) became middle schools (grades 6–8) in August 2018.

{| class="wikitable"
!School
!Location
!Opened
!Mascot
!Colors
!Approx.Students
|-
|Emerson K-12
|Kirkland
|
|Dolphins
|Blue/green
| align="right" |28
|-
|Environmental (EAS)
|Kirkland
|
|Cedar Trees
|Brown/green
| align="right" |141
|-
|Evergreen Middle School
|Redmond
|
|Eagles
|Green/blue
| align="right" |1,238
|-
|Finn Hill Middle School
|Kirkland
|
|Falcons
|Blue/gold
| align="right" |655
|-
|International (ICS)
|Kirkland
|
|Phoenix
|Red/gold/nlack
| align="right" |249
|-
|Inglewood Middle School
|Sammamish
|
|Knights
|Blue/silver
| align="right" |1,265
|-
|Kamiakin Middle School
|Kirkland
|
|Cougars
|Maroon/gold
| align="right" |596
|-
|Kirkland Middle School
|Kirkland
|
|Panthers
|Purple/white
| align="right" |608
|-
|Northstar Middle School
|Kirkland
|
|Patriots
|Red/white/blue
| align="right" |90
|-
|Redmond Middle School
|Redmond
|
|Grizzlies
|Black/red
| align="right" |1,057
|-
|Renaissance School of Art and Reasoning
|Sammamish
|
|Ravens
|Purple/black/silver
| align="right" |94
|-
|Rose Hill Middle School
|Redmond
|
|Royals
|Red/blue/white
| align="right" |944
|-
|Stella Schola Middle School
|Redmond
|
|Dragons/ 5 pointed stars
|Gold/blue
| align="right" |90
|-
|Timberline Middle School
|Redmond
| align="right" |2019
|Timberwolves
|Green/black/white
|
|}
As of August 2020

Elementary schools
As of June  2020, there are 33 elementary schools in LWSD.

{| class="wikitable sortable"
!School
!Location
!Opened
!Mascot
!Approx.Students
|-
|Alcott Elementary
| Redmond
|
| Orcas
|align="right"| 724
|-
|Audubon Elementary
| Redmond
|
| Owls
|align="right"| 560
|-
|Bell Elementary
| Kirkland
|
| Bulldogs
| align="right"| 440
|-
|Blackwell Elementary
| Sammamish
|
| Bobcats
| align="right" | 557
|-
|Carson Elementary
| Sammamish
|
| Falcons
| align="right" | 438
|-
|Clara Barton Elementary
|Redmond
|align="right"|2018
|Bobcats
|align="right"|612
|-
|Community School
| Kirkland
|
| 
|align="right"| 72
|-
|Dickinson Elementary
| Redmond
|
| Dragons
|align="right"| 353
|-
|Discovery Community School
| Kirkland
|
| 
|align="right"| 70
|-
|Einstein Elementary
| Redmond
|
| Otters
|align="right"| 425
|-
|Ella Baker Elementary
|Redmond
|align="right"|2018
| Bears
|align="right"|550
|-
|Emerson K-12
| Kirkland
|
| 
| align="right" | 31
|-
|Explorer Elementary
| Redmond
|
| 
| align="right" | 72
|-
|Franklin Elementary
| Kirkland
|
| Eagles
| align="right" | 481
|-
|Frost Elementary
| Kirkland
|
| 
| align="right" | 441
|-
|Juanita Elementary
| Kirkland
|
| Jaguars
| align="right" | 355
|-
|Keller Elementary
| Kirkland
|
| Snakes
| align="right" | 313
|-
|Kirk Elementary
| Kirkland
|
| Eagles
| align="right" | 639
|-
|Lakeview Elementary
| Kirkland
|
| Cheetahs
| align="right" | 558
|-
|Mann Elementary
| Redmond
|
| Colts
| align="right" | 383
|-
|McAuliffe Elementary
| Sammamish
|
| Challengers
| align="right" | 586
|-
|Mead Elementary
| Sammamish
|
| 
| align="right" | 666
|-
|Muir Elementary
| Kirkland
|
| Mountain Lions
| align="right" | 397
|-
|Redmond Elementary
| Redmond
|
| Hawks
| align="right" | 654
|-
|Rockwell Elementary
| Redmond
| 
| Beagles
| align="right" | 547
|-
|Rosa Parks Elementary
| Redmond Ridge
|
| Pumas
| align="right" | 650
|-
|Rose Hill Elementary
| Kirkland
|
| Racoons
| align="right" | 487
|-
|Rush Elementary
| Redmond
|
| Cheetahs
| align="right" | 681
|-
|Sandburg Elementary
| Kirkland
|
|Seals
| align="right" | 444
|-
|Smith Elementary
| Sammamish
|
| Dolphins
| align="right" | 677
|-
|Thoreau Elementary
| Kirkland
|
| Frogs
| align="right" | 482
|-
|Twain Elementary
| Kirkland
|
| Bobcats
| align="right" | 659
|-
|Wilder Elementary
| Woodinville
|
| Wolves
| align="right" | 369
|-
| Total
| 
|
| 
| align="right" | 15,379
|}
 As of October 2019

References

External links
 Official site
 Seattle Times district profile

Education in Redmond, Washington
Education in Kirkland, Washington
Education in Sammamish, Washington
Education in King County, Washington
School districts in Washington (state)
School districts established in 1944
1944 establishments in Washington (state)